Team Yey! is a Philippine children's television show created by Yey!, a defunct digital free-to-air channel of ABS-CBN TVplus. The show premiered on June 19, 2016, and was aired every Mondays to Sundays from 8:30 AM to 9:00 AM, with replays from 3:00 PM to 3:30 PM (originally on Yey!; now changed to Saturday mornings at 7:15 AM to 7:45 AM on Kapamilya Channel and 9:00 AM to 9:30 AM on A2Z). For over five seasons, Team Yey! was the first local children's program produced and aired on a digital-television-exclusive channel. On July 1, 2020, the show stopped airing after Yey! channel ceased its free-to-air broadcast operations as ordered by the National Telecommunications Commission (NTC) due to the expiration of ABS-CBN's legislative franchise.

The show has since moved to Kapamilya Channel. The show reruns from past seasons aired on free TV via A2Z every Saturdays.

Cast
Final hosts
 Sophia Reola (2016–2017 as a recurring host, 2017–2020 as a main host)
 Yesha Camile (2017–2020)
 Althea Guanzon (2016–2017 as a recurring host, 2017–2020 as a main host)
 Lei Andrei Navarro (2017–2020)
 Zyren dela Cruz (2018–2020)
 Lady Pipay Navarro (2018–2020)
 Erika Clemente (2018–2020)
 Xia Vigor (2019–2020)
 Marco Masa (2019–2020)
 Kaycee (2019–2020)
 Chunsa Jung (2020)
 Prince Llord Encelan (2020)
 Katelynne Ramos (2020)
 Robbie Wachtel (2020)
 JJ Quilantang (2020)
Former hosts
 JM Canlas (2016–2017 as a recurring host, 2017–2019 as a main host)
 AJ Urquia (2016–2017)
 Sam Shoaf (2016–2017)
 Raven Cajuguiran (2016–2017)
 Luke Alford (2016–2017)
 Noel Comia Jr. (2016–2018)
 Mitch Naco (2016–2018)
 Lukas Magellano (2018)
 Marcus Cabais (2018)
 Reese Tutanes (2018)
 Sofia Millares (2016–2017)
 Orange Bilgera (2018–2019)
 Hannah Lopez Vito (2016–2019)
 Jana Agoncillo (2017-2019)
 Santino Santiago (2018–2020)
 Omar Uddin (2019–2020)

Segments
 Galaw Go! (airs every Mondays)
 Snaks Naman (airs every Tuesdays)
 Artstig (airs every Wednesdays)
 Game Play (airs every Thursdays)
 StorYey (airs every Fridays)
 Sound Check (airs every Saturdays)
 Sunday Funday (airs every Sundays)

See also
List of programs broadcast by Yey!
List of programs aired by Kapamilya Channel
Goin' Bulilit

References

2016 Philippine television series debuts
2020 Philippine television series endings
2010s Philippine television series
2020s Philippine television series
Philippine children's television series
Filipino-language television shows